Patrick Bradley was a male rower who competed for England.

Rowing career
He represented England and won a bronze medal in the eights at the 1950 British Empire Games in Auckland, New Zealand.

References

English male rowers
Rowers at the 1950 British Empire Games
Commonwealth Games medallists in rowing
Commonwealth Games bronze medallists for England
Medallists at the 1950 British Empire Games